Richard Patterson may refer to: 

 Richard Cunningham Patterson Jr. (1886–1966), U.S. ambassador
 Richard Patterson (artist) (born 1963), English artist
 Richard H. Patterson (1931–2010), United States Coast Guard chief petty officer
 Richard North Patterson (born 1947), writer
 Richard Patterson, sailor on the whaleship Essex
 Richie Patterson (born 1983), New Zealand weightlifter